René Audran (1929 – Jan 25, 1985) was a senior official of the French Ministry of Defence who was responsible for managing the country's foreign arms sales. He is known for being assassinated on 25 January 1985 by the armed group Action directe (AD) in front of his residence in La Celle-Saint-Cloud.

Background 
Audran was a 1950 graduate of the École Polytechnique. At the time of his death, René Audran had attained the rank of Engineer General of the Corps of Armament. He was the Director of International Affairs (DAI) at the General Delegation for Armament (DGA). Audran was shot eight times in front of his home. He had been involved in arms sales to Iraq during the Iran–Iraq War, which arose suspicions that the Iranian government was involved in his assassination. His assassination occurred a year before Action directe's killing of industrialist Georges Besse who had been involved in nuclear cooperation with Iraq as well. After his death, Audran was awarded the Citation à l'ordre de la Nation. Members of Action directe were tried and convicted of his murder in 1987.

References

External links 
 Archives sur la mort de René Audran sur le site de l'INA
 Reportage de France 2 relatant les fonctions de vendeur d'armes de René Audran en Irak

1929 births
1985 deaths
Assassinated French politicians
Assassinated military personnel
Autonomism
Communist terrorism
École Polytechnique alumni
French generals
French terrorism victims
People murdered in France
Place of birth missing
Terrorism deaths in France